The 2003 Vale by-election was held in the States of Guernsey district of Vale on 9 July 2003, following the resignation of deputy Rodney Collenette due to ill health. Graham Guille was elected as the new deputy.

Result

References

By-elections in Guernsey
Vale by-election
Vale by-election
Vale by-election